The 1941 college football regular season was the 73rd season of intercollegiate football in the United States.  Competition included schools from the Big Ten Conference, the Pacific Coast Conference (PCC), the Southeastern Conference (SEC), the Big Six Conference, the Southern Conference, the Southwestern Conference, and numerous smaller conferences and independent programs.

The teams ranked highest in the final Associated Press poll in December 1941 were:
 Minnesota, under head coach Bernie Bierman, compiled a perfect 8–0 record, won the Big Ten  championship, and was ranked No. 1. It was Minnesota's fifth national championship in eight years. 
 Duke compiled a 9–0 record in the regular season, won the Southern Conference championship, and was ranked No. 2.  
 Notre Dame, led by head coach Frank Leahy, compiled an 8–0–1 record and was ranked No. 3.
 Texas, led by head coach Dana X. Bible, compiled an 8–1–1 record and was ranked No. 4. Texas was named by one contemporary major selector, the math-based Williamson System, as its No. 1 team.  
 Michigan, led by head coach Fritz Crisler, compiled a 6–1–1 record and was ranked No. 5.

Minnesota halfback Bruce Smith won the 1941 Heisman Trophy, and Virginia halfback Bill Dudley won the 1941 Maxwell Award. The season's statistical leaders included Frank Sinkwich of Georgia with 1,103 rushing yards, Bud Schwenk of Washington University in St. Louis with 1,457 passing yards, Hank Stanton of Arizona with 820 receiving yards, and Bill Dudley with 134 points scored.

In the four major bowl games, No. 2 Duke lost to PCC champion Oregon State in the Rose Bowl, No. 6 Fordham defeated No. 7 Missouri in the Sugar Bowl, No. 14 Georgia defeated unranked TCU in the Orange Bowl, and No. 20 Alabama defeated No. 9 Texas A&M Aggies in the Cotton Bowl. The Rose Bowl was moved from Pasadena, California, to Durham, North Carolina, due to security concerns on the West Coast following the December 7 attack on Pearl Harbor.

Conference and program changes

Conference changes
One conference played its final season in 1941:
Michigan-Ontario Collegiate Conference – conference active since the 1930 season

September
September 20	Tennessee beat Furman 32–6 and Boston College beat St. Anselm, 78–0.

September 27
In Seattle, defending champion Minnesota beat Washington 14–6, while in New Orleans, Boston College fell to Tulane, 21–7.  Stanford beat Oregon 19–15, Michigan beat Michigan State 19–7, Texas won at Colorado, 34–6 and Duke beat Wake Forest 43–14. Tennessee was idle

October
October 4 Minnesota was idle.  Tennessee lost at Duke, 19–0.  In New York, Fordham beat SMU 16–10.  Elsewhere, it was Stanford over UCLA 33–0,  Michigan over Iowa 6–0, Northwestern beating Kansas State 51–3 and Texas defeating LSU 34–0.

October 11 Minnesota beat Illinois 34–6, Northwestern beat Wisconsin 41–14, and Michigan beat Pittsburgh 40–0.  In Baltimore, Duke beat Maryland 50–0, while in Dallas, Texas beat Oklahoma 40–7.  Fordham won at North Carolina 27–14.  Stanford lost at Oregon State 10–0.
In the poll that followed, Minnesota was ranked No. 1, followed by Texas, Duke, Fordham, and Northwestern.

On October 16, the penalty flag was used for the first time in the 1941 Oklahoma City vs. Youngstown football game in Youngstown, Ohio.

October 18 No. 1 Minnesota beat Pittsburgh 39–0.  No. 2 Texas defeated Arkansas 48–14.  No. 3 Duke beat visiting Colgate 27–14. In Ann Arbor, No. 6 Michigan beat visiting No. 5 Northwestern 14–7.  No. 7 Navy beat Cornell 14–0 in Baltimore. The next poll featured No. 1 Minnesota, No. 2 Texas, No. 3 Michigan, No. 4 Duke, and No. 5 Navy. Fordham dropped from No. 4 to No. 6 despite a 27–0 defeat of West Virginia.

October 25 The biggest game of the year took place in Ann Arbor, Michigan, as No. 1 Minnesota defeated
No. 3 Michigan, 7–0.
No. 2 Texas beat Rice 40–0.  No. 4 Duke won at Pittsburgh 27–7.  No. 5 Navy and Harvard played to a 0–0 tie.  No. 6 Fordham beat TCU 28–14, while No. 9 Texas A&M won at Baylor 48–0, to reach 5–0–0.  In the vote that followed, Minnesota received 60 first place votes, and Texas received 53.  When the points were tallied, they both had 1,161 points and were tied for No. 1. Fordham, Duke, and Texas A&M rounded out the top five.

November
November 1 In Dallas, No. 1 Texas beat No. 20 SMU 34–0, while in Minneapolis, the other No. 1, Minnesota, edged No. 9 Northwestern 8–7.  In New York, No. 3 Fordham defeated Purdue 17–0, and in Atlanta, No. 4 Duke won at Georgia Tech 14–0.  In Little Rock, No. 5 Texas A&M beat Arkansas 7–0.  Texas was alone at No. 1 the following week, followed by Minnesota, Fordham, Duke and Texas A&M, all unbeaten and untied.

November 8 No. 1 Texas and Baylor played to a 7–7 tie.  No. 2 Minnesota beat Nebraska 9–0.  No. 3 Fordham lost at Pittsburgh 13–0.  No. 4 Duke won at Davidson 56–0.  No. 5 Texas A&M beat SMU 21–10.  No. 7 Notre Dame beat No. 6 Navy 20–13 in Baltimore and moved into fifth place behind Minnesota, Texas, Duke, and Texas A&M.

November 15 No. 1 Minnesota won at Iowa 34–13.  No. 2 Texas lost to Texas Christian (TCU) 14–7.  No. 3 Duke beat North Carolina 20–0.
In Houston, No. 4 Texas A&M beat Rice 19–6.  No. 5 Notre Dame won at No. 8 Northwestern 7–6.  No. 7 Michigan, which beat Columbia 28–0, moved up to No. 5 behind Minnesota, Texas A&M, Duke, and Notre Dame.

November 22  No. 1 Minnesota closed its season with a 41–6 win over Wisconsin in Minneapolis.  No. 2 Texas A&M was idle as it prepared for its Thanksgiving game.  No. 3 Duke won its season closer at N.C. State 55–6 to get a bid to Pasadena’s Rose Bowl. No. 4 Notre Dame beat USC 20–18.  No. 5 Michigan closed its season with a 20–20 tie against No. 14 Ohio State.  The top four remained the same, but No. 6 Duquesne (which had finished its season at 8–0–0) replaced Michigan at No. 5.

On Thanksgiving Day No. 2 Texas A&M lost to No. 10 Texas 23–0. The top five in the final AP Poll were No. 1 Minnesota, No. 2 Duke, No. 3 Notre Dame, No. 4 Texas, and No. 5 Michigan.

December 2 the Houlgate System published its "final selections" ranking Minnesota first, Navy second, and Alabama No. 3.

The bombing of Pearl Harbor on December 7 called into question whether Southern California would be safe from a Japanese attack on New Year's Day.  On December 15, bowl officials and U.S. Army officers met in San Francisco and decided to hold the game at Duke's stadium in Durham, North Carolina.

Conference standings

Major conference standings

Independents

Minor conferences

Minor conference standings

Rankings

Heisman Trophy voting
The Heisman Trophy is given to the year's most outstanding player

Bowl games

Statistical leaders

Team leaders

Total offense

Total defense

Rushing offense

Rushing defense

Passing offense

Passing defense

Individual leaders

Total offense

Rushing

Passing

Receiving

Scoring
The following were the scoring leaders for 1941.

Rules Committee
 Walter R. Okeson, chairman
 Earl Krieger, secretary
 Amos Alonzo Stagg (Pacific), life member
 W. J. Bingham (Harvard), 1st District
 Wilmer G. Crowell, 2nd District
 William Alexander (Georgia Tech), 3rd District]
 Fritz Crisler (Michigan), 4th District (substituting for Bernie Bierman)
 George F. Veenker (Iowa State), 5th District
 Dana X. Bible (Texas), 6th District
 C. W. Hubbard, 7th District (substituting for Lou H. Mahony)
 Willis O. Hunter (USC), 8th District

See also
 1941 College Football All-America Team

References